Adeberg is a surname. Notable people with the surname include:

Peter Adeberg (born 1968), German speed skater
Ulrike Adeberg (born 1970), German speed skater